Read My Mind may refer to:

 Read My Mind (album), a 1994 album by Reba McEntire
 "Read My Mind" (The Killers song), 2007
 "Read My Mind" (Sweetbox song), 2002
 "Read My Mind", a 2013 song by The Wanted from Word of Mouth